Procreate is a raster graphics editor app for digital painting developed and published by the Australian company Savage Interactive for iOS and iPadOS. It was launched on the App Store in 2011.

Versions

Procreate

Procreate for iPad was first released in 2011 by the Tasmanian software company Savage Interactive. After winning an Apple Design Award in June of 2013, Savage launched Procreate 2 in conjunction with iOS 7, adding new features such as higher resolution capabilities and more brush options. 

In 2016, Procreate became one of the top ten best-selling iPad apps on the App Store. It rose into the top two in 2017. In 2018, Procreate became the overall best selling iPad app.

As of February 2023, the most recent version of Procreate for the iPad is 5.3.2.

Procreate Pocket
Procreate Pocket was released to the App Store in December of 2014. Pocket originally included most tools found in Procreate; however, it did not include any features that released on the original Procreate app since its release. 

In 2018, Savage launched Procreate Pocket 2.0 to the App Store. 

In December of 2018, Procreate Pocket received Apple's "App of the Year" award.

As of February 2023, the most recent version of Procreate Pocket (for the iPhone) is 4.0.8.

Procreate Software Functions

Valkyrie graphics engine 
In 2019, Savage switched Procreate to a proprietary graphics engine, Valkyrie, following a period of beta testing on TestFlight. The engine is said to provide “customizable brush options and let [artists] import Adobe Photoshop brushes for the first time.” Alongside the new engine, Procreate 5 featured Brush Studio, a tool for creating new and modifying existing brushes with support for fine-tuning Apple Pencil settings.

Painting brush
Users can choose among various kinds of painting brushes to paint, use as merger or erasers. Categorizing painting brushes, adjusting features of certain brush, as well as inputting new brushes are allowed.

Color
Users are allowed to choose colors in 4 ways. Users can additionally create or insert color set for convenient use.

Layers
Users can add multiple layers. The maximum number of layers is decided by the resolution ratio. Effects can be added on layers. Merging layers is also permitted.

Transformation
Different transformations including rescaling, rotation, and distortion are included.

Lasso Tools
Including Rectangular Marquee Tool, Elliptical Marquee Tool, Lasso Tool and Magnetic Lasso Tool. User can select certain areas to do adjustments on it.

Adjustment
Users can adjust brightness, hue, contrast, etc. Certain effects including Gaussian Blur, Motion Blur are provided.

Canvas
Users can crop canvas, add guidelines to the current view, flip the canvas, and check canvas information. It is also possible to allow animation.

Export
Works can be exported to the following format: Procreate, PSD, PDF, JPEG, PNG, TIFF, (following for exporting layers) PDF, PNG, GIF(animation), PNG(animation), MP4(animation), and HEVC(animation). Procreate provides ingrained screen recording and the recorded video can also be exported.

Notable users
Kyle Lambert made the Stranger Things poster and a viral photo realistic "finger-painting" of Morgan Freeman in Procreate. 

Concept artist Doug Chiang creates robot, vehicle, and creature designs for Star Wars in Procreate. 

John Dyer, the English landscape painter, was sponsored by Savage Interactive and used Procreate as part of the "Last Chance to Paint" project, a partnership with the Eden Project that sent Dyer to stay with the Yaminawá in the Amazon rainforest, where he painted the experience. 

Professional artists have also used Procreate to create the posters for Stranger Things, Logan, and Blade Runner 2049, as well as several covers for The New Yorker. It has also been professionally adopted at Marvel Comics, DC Comics, Disney Animation, and Pixar.

See also
Digital art
Digital painting
Graphic art software
Raster graphics
Comparison of raster graphics editors

References

External links 

2011 software
Digital art
Graphics software
IOS software
IPadOS software
Raster graphics editors